Wandan may refer to;
Wandan, Iran, in Zanjan Province, Iran
Wandan, Pingtung, Taiwan